Yeldos Zhumakanov (born 29 August 1990) is a Kazakhstani judoka. He competed at the World Judo Championships in 2015, 2017, 2019 and 2021.

In 2018, he won one of the bronze medals in the men's 66 kg event at the 2018 Asian Games held in Jakarta, Indonesia. At the 2019 Asian-Pacific Judo Championships held in Fujairah, United Arab Emirates, he won the silver medal in the men's 66 kg event.

In 2021, he competed in the men's 66 kg event at the 2021 Judo World Masters held in Doha, Qatar. A few months later, he won one of the bronze medals in this event at the 2021 Asian-Pacific Judo Championships held in Bishkek, Kyrgyzstan.

References

External links
 

Living people
1990 births
Place of birth missing (living people)
Kazakhstani male judoka
Judoka at the 2018 Asian Games
Asian Games silver medalists for Kazakhstan
Asian Games bronze medalists for Kazakhstan
Asian Games medalists in judo
Medalists at the 2018 Asian Games
21st-century Kazakhstani people